William Thomas Small-Smith (born 31 March 1992) is a former South African rugby union professional player for the  in the Pro14 and the  in the Currie Cup. His regular position is centre.

Career

Youth level
He then attended Grey College in Bloemfontein, where he represented  at Under-16 and Under-18 levels between 2008 and 2010, during which time he was included in an Elite Squad, an S.A. Academy squad and a South Africa Schools High Performance squad.

Blue Bulls
He also made a further fourteen appearances for the Under-19 team that season.

Sevens and Junior World Championships
At the end of 2011, however, he linked up with the South Africa Sevens squad for three legs of the 2011–12 IRB Sevens World Series. He returned to represent the victorious South Africa Under-20 team in the 2012 IRB Junior World Championship.

Varsity Cup
Small-Smith also represented  in the 2013, but picked up an injury prior to the final against .

Cheetahs

Pirates Touch Rugby
In 2022 he currently plays one touch rugby at Pirates rugby club in Johannesburg on Monday nights. Mainly partaking in Div 1 of the league but sometimes throws the ball around in Div 3. He is known to put in a dive on an incredible hard field to make a touch. Some say he is harder than the field.

References

South African rugby union players
Living people
1992 births
Rugby union players from Johannesburg
Rugby union centres
Alumni of Grey College, Bloemfontein
Blue Bulls players
Bulls (rugby union) players
South Africa international rugby sevens players
South Africa Under-20 international rugby union players
Cheetahs (rugby union) players
Free State Cheetahs players